Tureia (also called Papahena) is an atoll in the Tuamotu Archipelago in French Polynesia.

A very long island covers completely its eastern reef. The lagoon has no navigable entrance.

The village of Hakamaru (or Fakamaru) is the only settlement on Tureia, at the northern tip of the atoll. Almost all of the arable land on Tureia is dedicated to growing coconuts. The population in this atoll has risen to 275 in 2017; in 1977 there were only 121 inhabitants.

History
The first recorded European to arrive at Tureia was Captain Edward Edwards in 1791, during his search for the Bounty mutineers. Edwards called the atoll "Carysfort", after John Proby, 1st Earl of Carysfort.

From 1966 to 1999, Tureia hosted an outpost of the Centre d'Expérimentation du Pacifique, the French authority supervising nuclear tests on the nearby atolls of Moruroa and Fangataufa, which lie about 115 km south of Tureia. There was also a weather station on Tureia during those years. Currently, both installations have been abandoned.

This atoll has a 900 m-long airstrip . Tureia Airport was inaugurated in 1985.

Administration
Administratively Tureia Atoll is part of the commune of Tureia, which also includes the atolls of Fangataufa, Moruroa, Tematangi and Vanavana.

References

External links

Tureia Airport
Atoll list (in French)
Pictures of Tureia (in French)

Atolls of the Tuamotus
Communes of French Polynesia